Mona Brorsson (born 28 March 1990) is a Swedish female biathlete. She competed in the World Cup during the 2014–15 season, and represented Sweden during the 2015 Biathlon World Championships in Kontiolahti, Finland.

Biathlon results
All results are sourced from the International Biathlon Union.

Olympic Games
2 medals (1 gold, 1 silver)

World Championships
1 medal (1 silver)

*During Olympic seasons competitions are only held for those events not included in the Olympic program.
**The single mixed relay was added as an event in 2019.

World Cup

Individual podiums
 1 podium (1 In)

References

External links

1990 births
Living people
Swedish female biathletes
Olympic biathletes of Sweden
Biathletes at the 2018 Winter Olympics
Biathletes at the 2022 Winter Olympics
Medalists at the 2018 Winter Olympics
Medalists at the 2022 Winter Olympics
Olympic medalists in biathlon
Olympic gold medalists for Sweden
Olympic silver medalists for Sweden
Biathlon World Championships medalists
People from Eda Municipality
21st-century Swedish women